Moursund is a surname. Notable people with the surname include:

Albert W. Moursund III (1919–2002), American lawyer and politician
Albert Wadel Hansen Moursund (1845–1927), American judge and politician
Anton N. Moursund (1877–1965), American judge and politician
David Moursund (1936–2021), American mathematician, computer scientist, and educator
Kristian Moursund (1853–1892), Norwegian lawyer and politician
Travis Bruce Moursund (1901–1959), American politician